I Want to be a Boarder, or איך ווילן צו זיין אַ באָרדער (Ikh Vil Zayn a Boarder) in Yiddish, is a 1937 American comedy short film starring Leo Fuchs and Yetta Zwerling, excerpted from the Yiddish language feature film American Matchmaker. It is a parody of Hollywood's optimism and grandiose nature, as well as famous Hollywood actors, particularly Fred Astaire.

Synopsis
Chaim (Leo Fuchs) and his wife (Yetta Zwerling) are in a difficult relationship, and cannot decide whether to separate or divorce. Instead, in order to enhance their sex life, they decide to play a game in which Chaim pretends to be a boarder, and the wife to be a landlady. However, when Chaim's wife begins to fall for the "boarder," the game soon gets out of hand.

Cast
 Leo Fuchs as Chaim
 Yetta Zwerling as Chaim's wife

References

External links
 I Want to Be a Boarder at the Internet Movie Database
 I Want to Be A Boarder on The National Center for Jewish Film

1937 films
Yiddish-language films
American parody films
1930s parody films
Yiddish-language mass media in the United States
American black-and-white films
1937 short films
American comedy short films
1937 comedy films
1930s American films